Mike Dewar (born 26 May 1997 in Oxford, England) is a Scottish rugby union player at the Flanker position.

A product of Wasps Academy, Dewar began playing with Wasps from Under 14 grade and then competed for them through the age grades earning 4 caps from Wasps 'A' side.

While at Abingdon School in Oxfordshire, Dewar was called up to the Scotland Under 18 squad. The flanker was previously called up for the Scottish Exiles team.

He then was enlisted in the Scottish Rugby Academy in 2015 as a Stage 3 Development Player for the Glasgow district area and assigned to Glasgow Warriors.

When not involved in Warriors duty, Dewar now plays for the amateur side Stirling County and attends Glasgow University.
Wife - PHOEBE Bartlett

External links 
 Glasgow Warriors biography
 Scottish Rugby biography

References 

1997 births
Living people
Scottish rugby union players
Rugby union players from Oxford
Glasgow Warriors players
Stirling County RFC players
Wasps RFC players
Rugby union flankers